The 35th annual Toronto International Film Festival, (TIFF) was held in Toronto, Ontario, Canada between September 9 and September 19, 2010. The opening night gala presented Score: A Hockey Musical, a Canadian comedy-drama musical film. Last Night closed the festival on September 19.

2010 TIFF included 258 feature films, down from 264 in 2009. However, the number of short films at the 2010 festival increased to 81 (compared to 70 in 2009), making the total number of films 339, five more than in 2009.

Of the feature films, TIFF claims that 112 are world premieres, 24 are international premieres (i.e. the first screening outside the film's home country), and 98 are North American premieres. (In fact, some of the so-called premieres screened at the Telluride Film Festival before TIFF.)

Awards

Programmes

Gala Presentations
The Bang Bang Club by Steven Silver
Barney's Version by Richard J. Lewis
A Beginner's Guide to Endings by Jonathan Sobol
Black Swan by Darren Aronofsky
Casino Jack by George Hickenlooper
The Conspirator by Robert Redford
The Debt by John Madden
The Housemaid by Im Sang-soo
Janie Jones by David M. Rosenthal
The King's Speech by Tom Hooper
Last Night by Massy Tadjedin
Little White Lies by Guillaume Canet
Peep World by Barry Blaustein
Potiche by François Ozon
The Promise: The Making of Darkness on the Edge of Town by Thom Zimny
Sarah's Key by Gilles Paquet Brenner
The Town by Ben Affleck
The Way by Emilio Estevez
West is West by Andy De Emmony

Special Presentations
Score: A Hockey Musical by Michael McGowan
Last Night by Massy Tadjedin
127 Hours by Danny Boyle
AMIGO by John Sayles
Deep in the Woods by Benoît Jacquot
Everything Must Go by Dan Rush
Gorbaciòf - The Cashier who Liked Gambling by Stefano Incerti
Hereafter by Clint Eastwood
I'm Still Here by Casey Affleck
I Saw the Devil by Kim Jee-woon
Julia's Eyes by Guillem Morales
The Last Circus by Álex de la Iglesia
Let Me In by Matt Reeves
The House by the Medlar Tree by Pasquale Scimeca
Mothers by Milcho Manchevski
Passione by John Turturro
Passion Play by Mitch Glazer
The Poll Diaries by Chris Kraus
Rio Sex Comedy by Jonathan Nossiter
Sarah's Key by Gilles Paquet Brenner
Special Treatment by Jeanne Labrune
What's Wrong With Virginia by Dustin Lance Black

Masters
13 Assassins by Takashi Miike
Essential Killing by Jerzy Skolimowski
Film Socialisme by Jean-Luc Godard
I Wish I Knew by Jia Zhang-ke
Poetry by Lee Chang-dong
Roses à crédit by Amos Gitai
Route Irish by Ken Loach
The Sleeping Beauty by Catherine Breillat
The Strange Case of Angelica by Manoel de Oliveira
Uncle Boonmee Who Can Recall His Past Lives by Apichatpong Weerasethakul

Midnight Madness
Bunraku by Guy Moshe
The Butcher, the Chef and the Swordsman by Wuershan
Fire of Conscience by Dante Lam
Insidious by James Wan
Red Nights by Julien Carbon and Laurent Courtiaud
Stake Land by Jim Mickle
Super by James Gunn
Vanishing on 7th Street by Brad Anderson
The Ward by John Carpenter
Fubar II by Michael Dowse
The Legend of Beaver Dam by Jerome Sable

Canada First!
Amazon Falls by Katrin Bowen
Daydream Nation by Mike Goldbach
High Cost of Living by Deborah Chow
Oliver Sherman by Ryan Redford
Suspicions (Jaloux) by Patrick Demers
You Are Here by Daniel Cockburn

City to City
10 to 11 by Pelin Esmer
40 by Emre Sahin
Block-C by Zeki Demirkubuz
Dark Cloud by Theron Patterson
Distant by Nuri Bilge Ceylan
Hair by Tayfun Pirselimoğlu
The Majority by Seren Yüce
My Only Sunshine by Reha Erdem
September 12 by Özlem Sulak
Somersault in a Coffin by Dervis Zaim

Contemporary World Cinema
22nd of May by Koen Mortier
Africa United by Debs Gardner-Paterson
Aftershock by Feng Xiaogang
All About Love by Ann Hui
Anything You Want by Achero Mañas
Bad Faith by Kristian Petri
Behind Blue Skies by Hannes Holm
Black Ocean by Marion Hänsel
Blessed Events by Isabelle Stever
Break Up Club by Barbara Wong
Carancho by Pablo Trapero
Chico & Rita by Fernando Trueba, Javier Mariscal and Tono Errando
Crying Out (À l'origine d'un cri) by Robin Aubert
Detective Dee and the Mystery of the Phantom Flame by Tsui Hark
The Edge by Alexei Uchitel
Even the Rain by Icíar Bollaín
The First Grader by Justin Chadwick
The Fourth Portrait by Chung Mong-Hong
Home for Christmas by Bent Hamer
How I Ended This Summer by Alexei Popogrebsky
The Human Resources Manager by Eran Riklis
The Hunter by Rafi Pitts
I Am Slave by Gabriel Range
Jucy by Louise Alston
Lapland Odyssey by Dome Karukoski
Late Autumn by Kim Tae-yong
Leap Year by Michael Rowe
Life, Above All by Oliver Schmitz
The Light Thief by Aktan Arym Kubat
Mamma Gógó by Fridrik Thor Fridriksson
Matariki by Michael Bennett
The Matchmaker by Avi Nesher
Meek's Cutoff by Kelly Reichardt
Modra by Ingrid Veninger
My Joy by Sergei Loznitsa
Neds by Peter Mullan
Of Gods and Men by Xavier Beauvois
Oki's Movie by Hong Sangsoo
Outbound by Bogdan George Apetri
Sensation by Tom Hall
The Solitude of Prime Numbers by Saverio Constanzo
Tender Son – The Frankenstein Project by Kornél Mundruczó
Tracker by Ian Sharp
Three by Tom Tykwer
Silent Souls by Aleksei Fedorchenko
State of Violence by Khalo Matabane
White Irish Drinkers by John Gray
Womb by Benedek Fliegauf

Vanguard
At Ellen's Age by Pia Marais
The Christening by Marcin Wrona
Cold Fish by Sion Sono
Confessions by Tetsuya Nakashima
Easy Money by Daniel Espinosa
A Horrible Way to Die by Adam Wingard
Kaboom by Gregg Araki
L.A. Zombie by Bruce LaBruce
Microphone by Ahmad Abdalla
Monsters by Gareth Edwards
Our Day Will Come by Romain Gavras

Discovery
As If I Am Not There by Juanita Wilson
ATTENBERG by Athina Rachel Tsangiri
Autumn by Aamir Bashir
Beautiful Boy by Shawn Ku
Blame by Michael Henry
The Call by Stefano Pasetto
Ceremony by Max Winkler
Dirty Girl by Abe Sylvia
Girlfriend by Justin Lerner
Griff the Invisible by Leon Ford
Half of Oscar Manuel Martin Cuenca
Inside America by Barbara Eder
Look, Stranger by Arielle Javitch
Mandoo by Ebrahim Saeedi
Marimbas From Hell by Julio Hernández Cordón
Norberto's Deadline by Daniel Hendler
October by Diego Vega and Daniel Vega
The Piano in a Factory by Zhang Meng
Pinoy Sunday by Wei-Ting Ho
The Place in Between by Sarah Bouyain
Rare Exports: A Christmas Tale by Jalmari Helander
Sandcastle (film) by Boo Junfeng
Soul of Sand by Sidharth Srinivasan
Viva Riva! by Djo Tunda Wa Munga
Wasted on the Young by Ben C. Lucas
What I Most Want by Delfina Castagnino
The Whistleblower by Larysa Kondracki
Zephyr by Belma Bas

Future Projections
24 Hour Psycho Back and Forth and To and Fro by Douglas Gordon
Angst Essen/Eat Fear by Ming Wong
HEAVENHELL by Chris Chong Chan Fui and Yasuhiro Morinaga
In Love for the Mood by Ming Wong
Jeanne by Martin Arnold
Journey to the Moon by William Kentridge
Klatsassin by Stan Douglas
Man With a Movie Camera: The Global Remake by Perry Bard
NYman With A Movie Camera by Michael Nyman
Otolith III by The Otolith Group
Slidelength by Michael Snow
Soft Rains#6: Suburban Horror (part 1) by Jennifer McCoy and Kevin McCoy
Workers Leaving the Factory in Eleven Decades by Harun Farocki

Real to Reel
The Promise: The Making of Darkness on the Edge of Town by Thom Zimny
Erotic Man by Jørgen Leth
Nostalgia for the Light by Patricio Guzmán
ANPO: Art X War by Linda Hoaglund
Armadillo by Janus Metz
Boxing Gym by Frederick Wiseman
Cave of Forgotten Dreams by Werner Herzog
Client 9: The Rise and Fall of Eliot Spitzer by Alex Gibney
Cool It by Ondi Timoner
The Game of Death by Christophe Nick and Thomas Bornot
Genpin by Naomi Kawase
Guest by Jose Luis Guerin
Inside Job by Charles Ferguson
Machete Maidens Unleashed! by Mark Hartley
Mother of Rock: Lillian Roxon by Paul Clarke
Pink Saris by Kim Longinotto
The Pipe by Risteard Ó Domhnaill
Precious Life by Shlomi Eldar
The Sound of Mumbai: A Musical by Sarah McCarthy
Tabloid by Errol Morris
Tears of Gaza by Vibeke Løkkeberg
When My Child is Born by Guo Jing and Ke Dingding
Windfall by Laura Israel
!Women Art Revolution – A Secret History by Lynn Hershman Leeson

Sprockets Family Zone
Karla and Jonas by Charlotte Sachs Bostrup
Little Sister by Richard Bowen
Make Believe by J. Clay Tweel
Sammy's Adventures: The Secret Passage by Ben Stassen

Visions
The Autobiography of Nicolae Ceaușescu by Andrei Ujică
Brownian Movement by Nanouk Leopold
Curling by Denis Côté
The Ditch by Wang Bing
The Four Times by Michelangelo Frammartino
k.364 A Journey by Train by Douglas Gordon
Moscow 11:19:31 by Michael Nyman
Mourning for Anna (Trois temps après la mort d'Anna) by Catherine Martin
Over Your Cities Grass Will Grow by Sophie Fiennes
Promises Written in Water by Vincent Gallo
Summer of Goliath by Nicolás Pereda
A Useful Life by Federico Veiroj

Short Cuts
Above the Knee by Greg Atkins
The Adder's Bite by Firas Momani
Animal Control by Kire Paputts
The Camera and Christopher Merk by Brandon Cronenberg
Champagne by Hans Olson
The Closer You Get to Canada by John Bolton
Eggcellent by Martin Sokol
File Under Miscellaneous by Jeff Barnaby
A Fine Young Man by Kevan Funk
Green Crayons by Kazik Radwanski
The High Level Bridge by Trevor Anderson
Home: Life Advice by Aaron Phelan
How to Rid Your Lover of a Negative Emotion Caused by You by Nadia Litz
Interregnum by Nick Fox-Gieg
Lipsett Diaries by Theodore Ushev
Little Flowers (Les Fleurs de l'âge) by Vincent Biron
Living History by Isaac Cravit
Love. Marriage. Miscarriage. by Darragh McDonald
Marius Borodine by Emanuel Hoss-Desmarais
Manèges by Sophie Goyette
La Métropolitaine by Dan Popa
Mokhtar by Halima Ouardiri
Negativipeg by Matthew Rankin
The Old Ways by Michael Vass
On the Way to the Sea by Tao Gu
The Open Window by Cam Woykin
Poudre by Ky Nam Le Duc
Le Projet Sapporo by Marie-Josée Saint-Pierre
Sad Bear by Liz Van Allen Cairns and Joe LoBianco
Les Softies by Emmanuel Shirinian and Russell Bennett
Sophie Lavoie by Anne Émond
The Trenches (La Tranchée) by Claude Cloutier
Tsunami, Horses and Civilization by Carla Susanto
Turkey by Sara St. Onge
Vapor by Kaveh Nabatian
Wapawekka by Danis Goulet
Warchild by Caroline Monnet
Woman Waiting by Antoine Bourges
yesno by Brian D. Johnson

Canada's Top Ten
TIFF's annual Canada's Top Ten list, its national critics and festival programmers poll of the ten best feature and short films of the year, was released on December 15, 2010.

Feature films
Barney's Version — Richard J. Lewis
Curling — Denis Côté
Heartbeats (Les Amours imaginaires) — Xavier Dolan
The High Cost of Living — Deborah Chow
Incendies — Denis Villeneuve
Last Train Home — Lixin Fan
Modra — Ingrid Veninger
Mourning for Anna (Trois temps après la mort d'Anna) — Catherine Martin
Splice — Vincenzo Natali
Trigger — Bruce McDonald

Short films
Above the Knee — Greg Atkins
I Was a Child of Holocaust Survivors — Ann Marie Fleming
The Legend of Beaver Dam — Jerome Sable
Lipsett Diaries — Theodore Ushev
Little Flowers (Les Fleurs de l'âge) — Vincent Biron
The Little White Cloud That Cried — Guy Maddin
Marius Borodine — Emanuel Hoss-Desmarais
Mokhtar — Halima Ouardiri
On the Way to the Sea — Tao Gu
Vapor — Kaveh Nabatian

References

External links
 Official site
 2010 Toronto International Film Festival at IMDb

2010
2010 film festivals
2010 in Toronto
2010 in Canadian cinema
2010 festivals in North America